Hezekiah Stone Russell (December 7, 1835May 12, 1914) was an American  businessman and politician who served as the sixth Mayor of Pittsfield, Massachusetts.

Education
Russell graduated from Mount Pleasant Academy in Amherst, Massachusetts in 1852.

Business career
From 1865 to 1902 Russell operated a Boilermaking plant in Pittsfield, Massachusetts.

Public service
Russell was on the Pittsfield, Massachusetts Board of Public Works from 1892 to 1895, the City Council from 1897 to 1898. and Mayor of Pittsfield, from 1900 to 1901.

Mayor of Pittsfield
On December 5, 1899, Russell was elected Mayor of Pittsfield, Massachusetts by a small majority over S. A. Bailey.  Russell served as Mayor of Pittsfield, from 1900 to 1901.

Massachusetts House of Representatives

Russell was elected to serve in the Massachusetts House of Representatives for 1907.  Russell received 921 votes versus his opponents.  Democratic party candidate A. S. Prout received 406 votes, and the Socialist party candidate C. E. Hoff received 39 votes.  Russell served on the Committee on Roads and Bridges in the House of 1907.

Death
Russell died in Pittsfield, Massachusetts on May 12, 1914.

Notes

 

1835 births
1914 deaths
Mayors of Pittsfield, Massachusetts
Massachusetts city council members
Republican Party members of the Massachusetts House of Representatives
19th-century American politicians